Tonghe Subdistrict is a subdistrict in Baiyun District, Guangzhou, Guangdong province, China. , it has 16 residential communities under its administration:
Woshan Community
Baishan Community
Baiyunshan Pharmaceutical Company Community
Chanchushi Community
Baishuitang Community
Xieshan Community
Shiqiaotou Community
Rongshutou Community
Jinhu Community
Hewu Community
Yilüshanzhuang Community
Siwenjing Community
Fuhehuayuan Community
Yunxiang Community
Laozhuang Community
Xinzhuang Community
Dabei Community
Nanhubandao Community

See also 
 List of township-level divisions of Guangdong

References 

Township-level divisions of Guangdong
Baiyun District, Guangzhou
Subdistricts of the People's Republic of China